The Catholic League of France, sometimes referred to by contemporary (and modern) Catholics as the Holy League, was a major participant in the French Wars of Religion. The League, founded and led by Henry I, Duke of Guise, intended the eradication of Protestantism from Catholic France, as well as the replacement of King Henry III.

Pope Sixtus V, Philip II of Spain, and the Jesuits were all supporters of this Catholic party.

Origins 

Local confraternities were initially established by French Catholics to counter the Edict of Beaulieu in 1576. King Henry III placed himself at the head of these associations as a political counter to the ultra-Catholic League of Peronne. Following the repudiation of that edict by the Estates General, most of the local leagues were disbanded.

Following the illness and death of Francis, duke of Anjou, heir to the French throne, on 10 June 1584, Catholic nobles gathered at Nancy. In December 1584, the League drew up a treaty with Philip II's ambassadors at Joinville. Following this agreement, the Catholic confraternities and leagues were united as the Catholic League under the leadership of Henry I, Duke of Guise. 

The Catholic League aimed to preempt any seizure of power by the many Huguenots among the nobility and the court and to protect French Catholics' right to worship. The Catholic League's cause was fueled by the doctrine Extra Ecclesiam nulla salus. The Catholic League saw the House of Valois under King Henry III as too conciliatory, to the point of appeasement, towards the Huguenots, who made up nearly half of the French nobility. 

A further source of inspiration was the writings of English Catholic refugee Richard Verstegan, who used his many contacts throughout the strictly illegal and underground Catholic Church in England, Wales, and in Ireland to research, write, and publish accounts of the suffering of English, Welsh, and Irish Catholic Martyrs. To the fury of the English Court, Verstegan's books made the whole of Catholic Europe aware of the religious persecution taking place under the rule of Queen Elizabeth I. 

For this reason, while visiting Paris in 1588, Richard Verstegan was briefly imprisoned by King Henri III at the insistence of the English Ambassador, but, as the recent French translation of his 1587 book Theatrum crudelitatum Hæreticorum nostri temporis had already heavily contributed to the ideology of the Catholic League, Verstegan had many influential sympathisers and protectors. At the insistence of both the Catholic League and the Papal Nuncio, the French King refused Sir Francis Walsingham's demands for Verstegan's extradition to England to stand trial for high treason and the exiled Englishman was quietly released.

By this time, according to Louise Imogen Guiney, "the League in Paris had fallen from it's first ideals into mere partisanship", and the Duke of Guise increasingly used the League not only to defend the Catholic cause but also as a political tool in an attempt to usurp the French throne.

Catholic Leaguers saw their fight against Calvinism (the primary branch of Protestantism in France) as a Crusade against heresy and in defense of Catholics in France from an Elizabethan-style persecution. Increasingly, however, some of the League's pamphleteers blamed any natural disaster that occurred as God's way of punishing France for tolerating the existence of the Calvinist heresy.
 
The League, similarly to hardline Calvinists, also disapproved of Henry III's attempts to mediate peaceful coexistence between Catholics and Protestants. The Catholic League also saw moderate French Catholics known as Politiques, many of whom were jurists and intellectuals, as an equally serious threat. The Politiques, for their own part, were tired of pitched battles and tit for tat Sectarian murders by both sides. Instead, Politique preferred for a strong monarchy to enforce peaceful coexistence rather than further escalation of what had increasingly become a civil war.

History

The League immediately began to exert pressure on Henry III of France. Faced with this mounting opposition (spurred in part because the heir to the French throne, Henry of Navarre, was a Huguenot) he canceled the Peace of La Rochelle, re-criminalizing Protestantism and beginning a new chapter in the French Wars of Religion. However, Henry III also saw the danger posed by the Duke of Guise, who was gaining more and more power. On the Day of the Barricades, Henry III was forced to flee Paris, which resulted in Guise becoming the de facto ruler of France. Afraid of being deposed, the King decided to strike first. On December 23, 1588, Henry III's guardsmen assassinated the Duke and his brother, Louis II while the Duke's son, Charles of Lorraine, was imprisoned in the Bastille.

This move did little to consolidate the King's power and enraged both the surviving Guises and their followers. As a result, the King fled Paris and joined forces with Henry of Navarre, the throne's Calvinist heir presumptive. Both the King and Navarre began building an army with which to besiege Paris. On August 1, 1589, as the two Henrys besieged the city and prepared for their final assault, Jacques Clément, a Dominican lay brother with ties to the League, successfully infiltrated the King's entourage, dressed as a priest, and assassinated him. This was retaliation for the killing of the Duke of Guise and his brother. As he lay dying, the King begged Henry of Navarre to convert to Catholicism, calling it the only way to prevent further bloodshed. However, the King's death threw the army into disarray and Henry of Navarre was forced to lift the siege.

Although Henry of Navarre was now the legitimate King of France, the League's armies were so strong that he was unable to capture Paris and was forced to retreat south. Using arms and military advisors provided by Queen Elizabeth I, he achieved several military victories. However, he was unable to overcome the superior forces of the League, which commanded the loyalty of most Frenchmen and had the support of Philip II of Spain. The League then attempted to declare the Cardinal of Bourbon, Henry's uncle, as king Charles X of France on November 21, 1589, but his status as a prisoner of Henry of Navarre and his death in May 1590 removed all legitimacy from this gesture. Furthermore, the Cardinal refused to usurp the throne and supported his nephew, although to little avail.

Meanwhile, despite his devoutly Roman Catholic Faith, the jurist and highly important poet Jean de La Ceppède was a Politique who supported the claim of the Calvinist Henry of Navarre under Salic law to the throne of France. For this reason, La Ceppède was arrested in 1589, after Aix-en-Provence fell to the armies of the Catholic League. La Ceppède attempted to escape disguised as a shoemaker, but was shot and recaptured. La Ceppède was later released on the orders of a senior member of the League who held him in esteem.

Unable even agree upon the right candidate for the French throne (the League's support was split among several candidates, including Isabella, a Spanish princess, which made them appear to no longer have French interests at heart), the League's position weakened, but remained strong enough to keep Henry from besieging Paris. Finally, in a bid to peacefully end the war, Henry of Navarre was received into the Catholic Church on July 25, 1593, and was recognized as King Henry IV on February 27, 1594.

Under the rule of King Henry IV, the Edict of Nantes was passed, granting religious toleration and limited autonomy to the Huguenots and ensuring a lasting peace for France. The Catholic League, now lacking the threat of a Calvinist king, gradually disintegrated.

Assessment
Historian Mack Holt argues that historians have sometimes over-emphasised the political role of the League at the expense of its religious and devotional character:

References

Sources

Counter-Reformation
History of Catholicism in France
Religion in the Ancien Régime
1576 establishments in France
French Wars of Religion